Bani Qahtan castle is found in the Syrian Coastal Mountains, about 40 km from Latakia city.

History
The castle which was known as Bikisrail, was controlled by Byzantine doux of Antioch, Niketas of Mistheia, in 1032. It was later captured by Crusaders led by Tancred in 1111. The castle was later mentioned as being a stronghold in the hands of Nizari Ismaili in 1131, who surrendered it to Saladin in 1188.

Structure
The castle is totally damaged and not much remained from it, as its ruins are dated back to the 12th century. It is reached by car road through Baniyas-Jableh road from west. External walls are well preserved, which contain the whole massive of the castle. The castle is situated on a high mountain, accessible only from the south through a narrow piece of land.

Reference

Bibliography
 
 

Castles in Syria
Archaeological sites in Latakia Governorate
Buildings and structures in Latakia Governorate